All Hallows' Eve is a 2016 indie family Halloween film directed by Charlie Vaughn. The film stars Lexi Giovagnoli, John DeLuca, Ashley Argota, Diane Salinger, and Martin Klebba.

Plot
As Eve celebrates her birthday, she learns the truth of who she really is. For generations, her mother’s family has passed down an old amulet and the power of a witch to one girl on her 18th birthday. This time, it is her turn. While exploring her new powers, Eve attempts to summon her deceased mother, against the warnings of her best friend and Barnaby, her faithful protector. Instead, she accidentally summons an old ancestor who bears her no goodwill and is crazy and seeks to wreak havoc. The three friends are forced to flee for their lives. Time is ticking for her loved ones in danger, as Eve rushes to fix the mess around her. Only by realizing the power inside of herself will she be able to help them in time.

Cast 
 Lexi Giovagnoli as Eve Hallow
 John DeLuca as Wade
 Ashley Argota as Sarah Ettels
 Diane Salinger as Delayna Hallow
 Martin Klebba as Barnaby
 Dee Wallace as Haidy Hallow
 Tracey Gold as Didi Hallow
 Kelsey Impicciche as Alison Stone
 Pilot Saraceno as Jessa Moreland
 Daniel Cooksley as Richard Moreland
 Dillon Cavitt as Nathan

Production 
Principal photography began on November 3, 2015. The movie was shot in Conway, SC.

Release 
The movie was released on iTunes, Amazon and Google Play on September 27, 2016.

References 

2016 films
American independent films
American films about Halloween
2016 independent films
2010s English-language films
2010s American films